Alphonse-Amédée Cordonnier (1848–1930) was a French sculptor.

Born in La Madeleine, Nord, Cordonnier was educated in nearby Lille, then in Paris, then in Rome, on a scholarship funded by the foundation of Jean-Baptiste Wicar.  Cordonnier won the Prix de Rome for sculpture in 1877.

Combined with his realistic style, many of Coronnier's themes are progressive and socially minded, for example his Les Miséreux (the Destitute), Les Pauvres gens (the Poor), and L'inoculation et la fermentation (Inoculation and Fermentation), all to be seen at the Palais des Beaux-Arts de Lille.

Work 

 Printemps (Spring), 1883
 Maternity, now in the Place Adolphe-Chérioux, 15th arrondissement of Paris, 1899
 allegorical facade figures of Education and Vigilance for the Hôtel de Ville, Tours, circa 1900, for architect Victor Laloux
 allegorical figure of Sculpture (1900), facade of the Grand Palais, Paris
 The Sower, now at La Piscine Museum, Roubaix, 1907
 figures representing cotton-gathering and sheep-shearing, Hotel de Ville, Roubaix, 1911, for architect Victor Laloux
 the figure of Music, holding a lyre, for the facade of the Opéra de Lille, completed 1914, inaugurated 1923, for architect Louis M. Cordonnier
 Monument to Louis Pasteur, in Lille
 Jeanne d'Arc, Palais des Beaux-Arts de Lille

1848 births
1930 deaths
People from La Madeleine, Nord
French architectural sculptors
Prix de Rome for sculpture
20th-century French sculptors
19th-century French sculptors
French male sculptors
19th-century French male artists